Fujiwara no Akitsuna (藤原 顕綱; dates uncertain, ? – ) was a Japanese nobleman and waka poet of the Heian period.

Life 
The year of his birth is uncertain.

He was the adoptive father of Arisuke (有佐), a son of Emperor Go-Sanjō.

During the Kanji era (1087–1094) he became the governor of Sanuki Province, earning him the nickname Sanuki no Nyūdō (讃岐入道). He served in positions such as governor of Tanba Province and governor of Izumi Province, and by the end of his career was of Senior Fourth Rank, Lower Grade.

He probably took the tonsure in Kōwa 2 (1100).

It is uncertain when he died. Sonpi Bunmyaku says he died on the 27th day of the sixth month of Kōwa 5 (1103), at age 75 (by Japanese reckoning), but his poetry appears in the record of the Sakon no Gon-Chūjō Toshitada Ason-ke Uta-awase (左近権中将俊忠朝臣家歌合), which took place the following year.  places his death in the summer of Kajō 2 (1107).

Poetry 
The first uta-awase contest in which he took part was the Jōryaku Ninen Dairi Uta-awase (承暦二年内裏歌合) in Jōryaku 2 (1078). He took part in the poetic gatherings:
the Kaya no In-dono Shichiban Uta-awase (高陽院殿七番歌合) in the eighth month of Kanji 8 (1094);
the Ikuhō Mon'in Senzai-awase (郁芳門院前栽合) in the eighth month of Kahō 2 (1095); and
the Sakon no Gon-Chūjō Toshitada Ason-ke Uta-awase in the fifth month of Chōji 1 (1104).

He also held poetic gatherings at his own residence.

Twenty-five of his poems were included in imperial anthologies, including the Goshūishū. He left a personal collection, the Akitsuna Ason Shū. Among his most famous works is the following poem, which was submitted to the Sakon no Gon-Chūjō Toshitada Ason-ke Uta-awase and included in the first book of love poems in the Shikashū:

References

Citations

Works cited 

 
 
 

Waka poets
11th-century Japanese poets
Kuge
Year of birth unknown
1100s deaths
Year of birth uncertain